Aleksandr Yakovlevich Dokuchayev was an aircraft designer and builder in Russia prior to and during World War I.

Aircraft 

Most aircraft built by Dokuchayev were modified Farman designs, each unique.  His first aircraft, completed in 1910, was an Anzani-powered biplane of pusher configuration.  With 50 hp, the aircraft was tested, but may never have flown.  In 1912, he completed a sesquiplane version of a Farman IV, and in 1914 he flew another modified Farman type, this time a trainer aircraft with equal span wings and producing 80 hp with its Gnome-Rhone engine.  His fourth model was a return to the sesquiplane configuration, producing a trainer with three rudders operated on skis.  Number 5 was a simple monoplane of his own design, but his final design was another Farman modification.

See also 

 List of aircraft (C-D)
 Vasily Dokuchaev

References 

 

Aircraft manufacturers of Russia
Russian aerospace engineers
Year of birth missing
Year of death missing